Dennis Ombachi (born December 14, 1990) is a Kenyan rugby sevens player. He also was a member of the squad that competed at the 2013 Rugby World Cup Sevens in Russia.

References

External links 
 

1994 births
Living people
Rugby sevens players at the 2016 Summer Olympics
Olympic rugby sevens players of Kenya
Kenya international rugby sevens players
Male rugby sevens players
Kenyan rugby union players